Dara Bathhouse or Dara Hamam is a 19th-century monument in Sheki. It is located on the territory of the Historical and Architectural Reserve "Yukhary Bash". It is currently in an unusable condition. By the Decree of the Cabinet of Ministers of the Republic of Azerbaijan No 132 dated with 2 August 2001, the building is protected by state and is included in the list of the architectural monuments.

History 
In 1870, the businessman Mammadnabi ordered the construction of the Dara Bathhouse at a depth of 6 meters. The bathhouse consists of two large halls and utility rooms. It has a saloon, called outdoor or external, and a number of other bathing rooms. The locker rooms are connected to the bathing salon through utility rooms. Each saloon is covered with a dome on the top, in which small holes are made for the light to enter. Pools with cold and hot water are connected to utility rooms on the opposite side of the soap section. These pools are called "khazina". The water for the bath was supplied through clay pipes from a nearby old water pipe. The bath functioned until the 1980s. Its total area is  It consists of a dressing room, a bath, a room and a corridor.

Due to the recent disuse, the bath has fallen into disrepair, there is a danger of its destruction.

References 

World Heritage Sites in Azerbaijan
Baths of Shaki